Momir Rnić (born 3 February 1955) is a Serbian handball coach and former player who competed for Yugoslavia in the 1980 Summer Olympics, in the 1984 Summer Olympics, and in the 1988 Summer Olympics.

Club career
After starting out at Hercegovina Sečanj, Rnić briefly played for Proleter Zrenjanin, before moving to Crvenka. He later returned to Proleter Zrenjanin. In 1986, Rnić moved abroad to TV Niederwürzbach.

International career
At international level, Rnić represented Yugoslavia and competed in three Olympic Games, winning the gold medal in 1984 and the bronze medal in 1988. He also participated in two World Championships, winning the 1986 edition.

Coaching career
In 1990, Rnić became head coach of his former club Proleter Zrenjanin, taking them to the European Cup final in 1991 and winning the Yugoslav Championship in 1992.

Between 2001 and 2003, Rnić served as head coach of TVA Saarbrücken in the 2. Handball-Bundesliga. He took charge of Vojvodina in January 2004.

Personal life
Rnić is the father of fellow handball player Momir Rnić.

Honours

Player
TV Niederwürzbach
 2. Handball-Bundesliga: 1988–89

Coach
Proleter Zrenjanin
 Yugoslav Handball Championship: 1991–92

References

External links
 Olympic record
 

1955 births
Living people
People from Sečanj
Serbian male handball players
Yugoslav male handball players
Olympic handball players of Yugoslavia
Olympic gold medalists for Yugoslavia
Olympic bronze medalists for Yugoslavia
Handball players at the 1980 Summer Olympics
Handball players at the 1984 Summer Olympics
Handball players at the 1988 Summer Olympics
Olympic medalists in handball
Medalists at the 1984 Summer Olympics
Medalists at the 1988 Summer Olympics
Competitors at the 1979 Mediterranean Games
Competitors at the 1983 Mediterranean Games
Mediterranean Games gold medalists for Yugoslavia
Mediterranean Games medalists in handball
RK Proleter Zrenjanin players
RK Crvenka players
TV Niederwürzbach players
Handball-Bundesliga players
Expatriate handball players
Yugoslav expatriate sportspeople in Germany
Serbian handball coaches
Yugoslav handball coaches
Serbia and Montenegro expatriate sportspeople in Germany